Kirill Pozdnyakov (born 20 January 1989) is an Azerbaijani former professional racing cyclist, who rode professionally between 2013 and 2019 for teams ,  and two spells with the  team.

Career
In November 2015  announced that Pozdnyakov would rejoin them for the 2016 season, having been part of the team's squad in its debut season in 2013. He switched from Russian to Azerbaijani nationality in 2017.

Doping violation
In July 2019, the Azerbaijan Cycling Federation announced that he committed an Anti-Doping Rule Violation: Presence of a Prohibited Substance or its Metabolites or Markers in an Athlete’s Sample. The substance was Methylphenidate metabolite. His period of sanction began 11 May 2019, and he received 24 months of Ineligibility.

Major results

2011
 3rd Grand Prix Impanis-Van Petegem
2012
 5th Flèche Ardennaise
2013 
 1st Overall Tour of China I
1st Stage 6
 1st Stage 4 Rás Tailteann
 3rd Overall Tour de Taiwan
1st Stage 1
 3rd Overall Jelajah Malaysia
1st Stage 1
 6th Overall Oberösterreich Rundfahrt
2016
 1st  Overall Tour of Szeklerland
1st Stages 2 & 3a (ITT)
 1st Stage 3 (ITT) Sibiu Cycling Tour
 3rd Overall Okolo Slovenska
 7th Overall Tour of Croatia
2017
1st  Road race, National Road Championships
1st Overall Tour d'Azerbaïdjan
1st Mountains classification
1st Stage 2
3rd Overall Tour du Maroc
1st Stages 1 & 4
 8th Overall Settimana Internazionale di Coppi e Bartali
2018
 1st  Road race, National Road Championships
 1st Grand Prix Alanya
 2nd Overall Five Rings of Moscow
1st Points classification
1st Stage 4
 5th Overall Tour du Maroc
 7th Overall Tour of Mersin
1st Stage 1
2019
 8th Overall Rhône-Alpes Isère Tour

References

External links

1989 births
Living people
Russian male cyclists
Azerbaijani male cyclists
People from Unechsky District
Sportspeople from Bryansk Oblast